Michael Spies (born 9 July 1965) is a German former professional footballer who played as an attacking midfielder. He holds the record of being the only footballer to have represented seven Bundesliga clubs. He is now a player agent.

Honours 
 DFB-Pokal finalist: 1986

References

External links 
 

1965 births
Living people
Footballers from Stuttgart
German footballers
Association football midfielders
Association football forwards
Bundesliga players
2. Bundesliga players
VfB Stuttgart players
VfB Stuttgart II players
SSV Ulm 1846 players
Karlsruher SC players
Borussia Mönchengladbach players
FC Hansa Rostock players
Hamburger SV players
Dynamo Dresden players
VfL Wolfsburg players
SpVgg Unterhaching players
VfB Lübeck players